Megalobulimus proclivis is a species of tropical air-breathing land snail, a terrestrial pulmonate gastropod mollusk in the family Strophocheilidae. This species is endemic to Brazil.

References

proclivis
Endemic fauna of Brazil
Taxonomy articles created by Polbot
Gastropods described in 1888